Franklin W. Lutes (1840 – April 6, 1915) was a soldier in the Union Army and a Medal of Honor recipient for his actions in the American Civil War.

Lutes enlisted in the Army from Geddes, New York in March 1864. Serving with the 111th New York Infantry, he was captured at the Second Battle of Ream's Station, but later paroled and promoted to Corporal. When his regiment disbanded in 1865, he was transferred to the 4th US Artillery Regiment.

Medal of Honor citation
Rank and organization: Corporal, Company D, 111th New York Infantry. Place and date: At Petersburg, Va., March 31, 1865. Entered service at: ------. Birth: Oneida County, N.Y. Date of issue: April 3, 1865.

Citation:

Capture of flag of 41st Alabama Infantry (C.S.A.), together with the color bearer and one of the color guard.

See also

List of Medal of Honor recipients
List of American Civil War Medal of Honor recipients: G–L

References

External links

1840 births
1915 deaths
United States Army Medal of Honor recipients
United States Army soldiers
People from Onondaga County, New York
American Civil War recipients of the Medal of Honor